T17 may refer to:

Armored vehicles
 T17 Deerhound, an American six-wheeled armored car
 T17E1 Staghound, an American four-wheeled armored car
 T-17 tank, a Soviet tankette

Aviation
 English Electric Canberra T.17, a British trainer aircraft
 New Gulf Airport, in Wharton County, Texas, United States
 SAAB-MFI T-17, a Danish trainer aircraft 
 Thorp T-17, an American aircraft prototype

Rail and transit

Lines 
 T17 line, of the Stockholm Metro
 T17/18 Beijing-Mudanjiang Through Train

Stations 
 Kasai Station, Tokyo, Japan
 Miyakojima Station, Osaka, Japan
 Ōyachi Station (Hokkaido), Sapporo, Hokkaido, Japan
 Ueda Station (Nagoya), Nagoya, Aichi Prefecture, Japan
 Uzumasa Tenjingawa Station, Kyoto, Japan
 Zōda Station, Sanuki, Kagawa Prefecture, Japan

Weapons
 Shansi Type 17, a Chinese pistol
 T17E3, an American autocannon

Other uses
 Estonian national road 17

See also
 Type 17 (disambiguation)